Cossa is a surname of Mozambican and Italian origin that may refer to:
Albino Cossa (born 1982), Mozambican goalkeeper
Alfonso Cossa (1833–1902), Italian chemist
Anabela Cossa (born 1986), Mozambican basketball player
Baldassare Cossa (c. 1370 – 1419), 14th-century Italian Roman Catholic bishop
Celeste Cossa, 20th-century Mozambican women politician
Dominic Cossa (born 1935), American operatic lyric baritone
Elisa Cossa (born 1980), Mozambican athlete
Francesco del Cossa (c. 1430 – c. 1477), Italian Renaissance painter
Gaetano Cossa (died 1657), 17th-century Italian Roman Catholic archbishop
Giovanni Cossa (1400–1476), lieutenant general of Provence
Gisela Cossa (born 1999), Mozambican swimmer
Helder Cossa (born 1969), Mozambican footballer
Luigi Cossa (1831–1896),  Italian economist
Pietro Cossa (1830–1881), Italian dramatist
Roberto Cossa (born 1934), Argentinian playwright and theatre director
Sebastian Cossa (born 2002), Canadian ice hockey goaltender

Surnames of Italian origin
Mozambican surnames